Adjheï Abbady (born June 17, 1987) is an Ivorian female professional basketball player.

External links
Equipe nationale de Basket

1987 births
Living people
Ivorian women's basketball players